Hollywood on Trial is a 1976 American documentary film directed by David Helpern.

Synopsis
The film chronicles the 1947 hearings of the House Un-American Activities Committee, with a focus on the Hollywood Ten directors, screenwriters and producers cited for contempt of Congress and blacklisted by the movie industry after refusing to answer questions about their alleged involvement with the Communist Party. The documentary is narrated by John Huston and includes archival footage from the hearings and interviews with key participants in the hearings and studio figures affected by those events.

Accolades
It was nominated for an Academy Award for Best Documentary Feature, but lost to Barbara Kopple's Harlan County USA.

Cast

 John Huston - Narrator
 Walter Bernstein - Himself
 Alvah Bessie - Himself
 Lester Cole - Himself
 Gary Cooper - Himself (archive footage)
 Henry Daniell - Himself (archive footage)
 Howard Da Silva - Himself
 Walt Disney - Himself (archive footage)
 Edward Dmytryk - Himself
 Will Geer - Himself
 Millard Lampell - Himself
 Ring Lardner Jr. - Himself
 Albert Maltz - Himself
 Ben Margolis - Himself
 Louis B. Mayer - Himself (archive footage)
 Joseph McCarthy - Himself (archive footage)
 Zero Mostel - Himself
 Otto Preminger - Himself
 Ronald Reagan - Himself
 Martin Ritt - Himself
 Dore Schary - Himself
 Gale Sondergaard - Herself
 Leo Townsend - Himself
 Dalton Trumbo - Himself

References

External links
Hollywood on Trial at Corinth Films

Trailer

1976 films
1976 documentary films
American documentary films
American black-and-white films
American independent films
Documentary films about United States history
Documentary films about Hollywood, Los Angeles
Films about the Hollywood blacklist
1970s English-language films
1970s American films